Concepción is a municipality in the Honduran department of Ocotepeque.

Demographics
At the time of the 2013 Honduras census, Concepción municipality had a population of 5,074. Of these, 98.40% were Mestizo, 1.03% Indigenous (0.61% Lenca), 0.37% White and 0.20% Black or Afro-Honduran.

References

Municipalities of the Ocotepeque Department